Cezary Miszta (born 30 October 2001) is a Polish professional footballer who plays as a goalkeeper for Legia Warsaw.

Honours

Club
Legia Warsaw
Ekstraklasa: 2020-21

References

External links

2001 births
Living people
Polish footballers
People from Łuków
Association football goalkeepers
Poland youth international footballers
Poland under-21 international footballers
Motor Lublin players
Radomiak Radom players
Legia Warsaw players
Legia Warsaw II players
Ekstraklasa players
I liga players
III liga players